Cyanea lamarckii, also known as the blue jellyfish or bluefire jellyfish, is a species of jellyfish in the family Cyaneidae.

Description
Blue jellyfish age can be identified by color of their bell. They tend to be pale in appearance when young, but mature to have a brightly purple-blue (some yellow) colored bell. Although it is similar to the lion's mane jellyfish, the blue jellyfish is not as large, and has a translucent bell.

These jellyfish drift closer to the shore to catch the large abundance of plankton with their tentacles. This jellyfish has many stinging tentacles. The four mouth arms are large with many wrinkles and ripples. The jellyfish live off a diet of phytoplankton or zooplankton as well as the eggs and larvae of other aquatic animals such as fish. Cyanea lamarkii use their tentacles containing nematocysts to not only catch their prey, but to protect from predators.

Distribution
This species is found in the pelagic zone off the west coast of Scotland, the North Sea, the English Channel, and the Irish Sea, sometimes with the more common lion's mane jellyfish (Cyanea capillata).

Taxonomy
The taxonomy of Cyanea species is not fully agreed upon. Some zoologists have suggested that all species within the genus should be treated as one. However, Cyanea lamarckii exists with two other distinct taxa in at least the eastern North Atlantic.

The species specifier originates from the French naturalist Lamarck (Latin name form: Lamarckius).

Life cycle
The medusae bud and loosen from the mature polyps between January and March around the British Isles and southern North Sea. This occurs in a similar way to the life cycle of the moon jellyfish. These blue jellyfish live for less than a year.

References

Further reading

Howson, C.M.; Picton, B.E. (Ed.) (1997). The species directory of the marine fauna and flora of the British Isles and surrounding seas. Ulster Museum Publication, 276. The Ulster Museum: Belfast, UK. . vi, 508
Muller, Y. (2004). Faune et flore du littoral du Nord, du Pas-de-Calais et de la Belgique: inventaire. [Coastal fauna and flora of the Nord, Pas-de-Calais and Belgium: inventory]. Commission Régionale de Biologie Région Nord Pas-de-Calais: France. 307 pp.
Cornelius, P.F.S. (2001). Cubozoa, in: Costello, M.J. et al. (Ed.) (2001). European register of marine species: a check-list of the marine species in Europe and a bibliography of guides to their identification. Collection Patrimoines Naturels, 50: pp. 111

Cyaneidae
Cnidarians of the Atlantic Ocean
Animals described in 1810
Taxa named by Charles Alexandre Lesueur
Taxa named by François Péron